Solenidae, commonly called "razor shells", is a family of marine bivalve molluscs in the unassigned Euheterodonta.

Taxonomy
Originally, razor shells were all classified as Solenidae. Then, the genera were grouped into two sub-families, the Cultellinae and Soleninae. Later, the two subfamilies were recognized as separate families, with Cultellinae accepted as Pharidae and the family Solenidae containing only the two genera Solen and Solena.

Genera
Genera in the family Solenidae include:
 Solen Linnaeus, 1758
 Solena Mörch, 1853

References

 
Bivalve families